Michael Eric John Black  (born 22 March 1940) is a former Chief Justice of the Federal Court of Australia.

Background and career

Black was born in the Kingdom of Egypt, where his father was serving as an officer in the Royal Air Force. He attended schools in Egypt, England, and Australia (Wesley College, Melbourne). He graduated with a Bachelor of Laws from the University of Melbourne in 1963.

In 1964, Black commenced practice at the Victorian Bar. His practice included civil jury actions as well as commercial and public law cases.

Black was appointed Queen's Counsel for Victoria in 1980 and for Tasmania in 1984. As Queen's Counsel, he specialised in appellate work, including cases in constitutional, commercial and industrial law. One of the constitutional cases was the Tasmanian Dam Case in 1983, where he represented the Tasmanian Wilderness Society.

Upon the death of Queen Elizabeth II, his title changed to King's Counsel (K.C.) automatically.

Judicial and later career

He was appointed Chief Justice of the Federal Court of Australia on 1 January 1991. As Chief Justice, he had, as well as his judicial duties, statutory responsibility for the administration of the Court.

In 1981, he was appointed the Foundation Chairman of the Victorian Bar's Readers Course, the Bar's pioneering course of instruction for new barristers, and later served as the representative of the Victorian Bar on the Board of the Leo Cussen Institute for Continuing Legal Education. As Chief Justice, he actively supported the Federal Court's work in the field of judicial education. He was also Chair of the Advisory Committee for introduction of the Juris Doctor degree at Melbourne Law School. He retired as Chief Justice on 21 March 2010 and was succeeded by Patrick Keane.

Honours

On Australia Day, 1998, he was appointed Companion of the Order of Australia (AC) for service to the law, to the legal profession and to the judiciary.

Personal life
His interests outside the law include architecture, history, and maritime matters.

References

External links

 Transcripts of Federal Court farewell sittings
 Former Justices of the Federal Court of Australia
 

1940 births
Living people
Chief Justices of the Federal Court of Australia
Judges of the Federal Court of Australia
20th-century King's Counsel
Australian King's Counsel
Australian barristers
Companions of the Order of Australia
People educated at Wesley College (Victoria)
Melbourne Law School alumni
British expatriates in Australia
British emigrants to Australia